Translation Memory eXchange (TMX) is an XML specification for the exchange of translation memory (TM) data between computer-aided translation and localization tools with little or no loss of critical data.

TMX was originally developed and maintained by OSCAR (Open Standards for Container/Content Allowing Re-use), a special interest group of LISA (Localization Industry Standards Association), and first released in 1997. Specification 1.4b of 2005 remained current . It allows the original source and target documents to be recreated from the TMX data. A working draft of TMX 2.0 was released for public comment in March 2007 but no work was done on the new version; in March 2011 LISA was declared insolvent and as a result its standards were moved under a Creative Commons license and the standards specification relocated.

TMX forms part of the Open Architecture for XML Authoring and Localization (OAXAL) reference architecture.

Example 
An example of a TMX document with one entry:
<tmx version="1.4">
  <header
    creationtool="XYZTool" creationtoolversion="1.01-023"
    datatype="PlainText" segtype="sentence"
    adminlang="en-us" srclang="en"
    o-tmf="ABCTransMem"/>
  <body>
    <tu>
      <tuv xml:lang="en">
        <seg>Hello world!</seg>
      </tuv>
      <tuv xml:lang="fr">
        <seg>Bonjour tout le monde!</seg>
      </tuv>
    </tu>
  </body>
</tmx>

References 

Computer-assisted translation
XML markup languages
Industry-specific XML-based standards